Come Along is the fourth studio album by Swedish recording artist Titiyo. It was released on August 20, 2001 on WEA/Superstudio Blå. All music was composed by Peter Svensson, lyrics were written by Svensson and Joakim Berg, and production was handled by Tore Johansson. The album's lead single, "Come Along", reached the first place in GLF and was awarded a Swedish Grammis Award in the category Song of the Year. "1989" was released as the second and final single off the album.

Track listing

Charts

Weekly charts

Year-end charts

Certifications and sales

References

External links
 Titiyo.com — official site

2001 albums
Titiyo albums